Chytroglossa is a genus of flowering plants from the orchid family, Orchidaceae. It contains three recognized species, all endemic to southeastern Brazil.

Species 
 Chytroglossa aurata  Rchb.f. (1863)
 Chytroglossa marileoniae  Rchb.f. (1863) 
 Chytroglossa paulensis  Edwall (1903)

See also 
 List of Orchidaceae genera

References 

  (1863) Hamburger Garten- und Blumenzeitung 19: 546.
  (2005) Handbuch der Orchideen-Namen. Dictionary of Orchid Names. Dizionario dei nomi delle orchidee. Ulmer, Stuttgart
  (2009). Epidendroideae (Part two). Genera Orchidacearum 5: 243 ff. Oxford University Press.

External links 

 
Oncidiinae genera
Orchids of Brazil